is a dish originating in Japan. It consists of a donburi type large bowl filled with steamed white rice, and topped with fillets of eel (unagi) grilled in a style known as kabayaki, similar to teriyaki. The fillets are glazed with a sweetened soy-based sauce, called tare and caramelized, preferably over charcoal fire. The fillets are not flayed, and the grayish skin side is placed faced down. Sufficient tare sauce is poured over so that some of it seeps through the rice underneath. By convention, pulverized dried berries of sanshō (called Japanese pepper, although botanically unrelated) are sprinkled on top as seasoning. It is also very popular outside of Japan, particularly in Taiwan and the United States.

Variations

Variations include unajū (鰻重, the same dish served in jūbako (重箱), food boxes often lacquered), nagayaki (長焼き, the eel and rice are served separately), and hitsumabushi (ひつまぶし).

There are two styles of grilled eel, the topic of which is covered more precisely under kabayaki. Essentially, in the Kantō region style, the eel is steamed before being grilled with sauce, which makes the eel more tender. The other is the Kansai region style, which is grilled without steaming.

History
Una-don was the first type of donburi rice dish, invented in the late Edo period, during the Bunka era (1804–1818) by a man named  of Sakai-machi (in present-day Nihonbashi Ningyōchō, Chūō, Tokyo), and became a hit in the neighborhood, where the Nakamura-za and Ichimura-za once stood.

After the great famine of 1844, it started selling the unadon for one oblong Tenpō-sen coin, and became a hit.

As for unajū, where the eel and rice is stuffed in jūbako boxes, one theory ascribes its originator to one , who started a freshwater fish restaurant business in Sanya, Asakusa, Tokyo, called  (later known as Jūbako, the current generation of the restaurant is in Akasaka). According to this version the unajū was already around by late Edo period, but there are detractors to this view. Other commentators say unajū appeared in the Taishō era, and by using lacquered boxes, aimed at appearance of luxury. Unajū is usually pricier than unadon.

See also

Katsudon
Gyūdon

Notes

References

Donburi
Japanese rice dishes